Akron Community Foundation is a permanent philanthropic endowment targeting Summit County, Ohio, residents and greater Akron, Ohio.

Overview
Akron Community Foundation is composed of more than 780 funds representing individuals, families, organizations, corporations and issues. .

As of December 31, 2021, the community foundation had assets of nearly $300 million and had awarded nearly $206 million in grants since its inception.
John T. Petures Jr. heads the foundation's 20-person staff, and Sylvia Trundle leads the 24-person volunteer board.

History 
Akron Community Foundation began in 1955 with an initial gift of $1,033,533 from Edwin Coupland Shaw, an Akron industrialist. Shaw's goal, as expressed in his will, was to create a way for local residents to give back to their community as the community's needs changed over time. a.

Shaw died in 1941, but other citizens continue to make gifts to the community foundation. Since the time of Shaw's original bequest of $1 million, the foundation has grown to nearly $300 million to support the health, educational, cultural and welfare needs of Summit County residents.

Grant-making 
The community foundation awards grants to eligible 501(c)(3), 509(a) public charities, as determined by the IRS.

Akron Community Foundation's grantmaking procedures vary depending on how each of the more than 700 funds is set up. However, the community foundation follows a basic set of grantmaking guidelines when reviewing applications. The community foundation's Community Investment Committee and board of directors oversee all grantmaking activity. 
Only one grant from the community foundation's Community Fund can be awarded to an organization per fiscal year.

Awards 
One of the community foundation's awards is the Bert A. Polsky Humanitarian Award. The Polsky Humanitarian Award was established in 1969 to honor the late Bert A. Polsky, president of the former Polsky Department stores, . and also was a founding trustee of the foundation  . In 2019, the award went to Dave Lieberth.

Funds 
 
The Women's Endowment Fund was established in 1993 and supportS the needs of local women and girls. In the past, it has supported organizations such as the International Institute of Akron, the Battered Women's Shelter, and the Victim Assistance Program.

The Gay Community Endowment Fund  established in 2001 helps local organizations and programs that support Summit County's lesbian, gay, bisexual and transgender population. It has made grants to the Rape Crisis Center, Akron Area Pride Collective, and the Akron AIDS Collaborative.

The Medina County Community Fund helps nonprofits. Established in 1993, it focuses on improving residents' lives now and in the future. Recently, it has made grants to Feeding Medina County, Medina Creative Housing and ORMACO.

The Medina County Women's Endowment Fund was established in 1998 for Medina County's women and children. Structured in concert with Akron Community Foundation's Women's Endowment Fund, which serves Summit County, it  accepts grant applications for organizations and programs that support women and children in the Medina County area. It specifically makes grants to programs that create opportunities for the educational, physical, emotional, social, artistic and personal growth of women and children. Recently, it has made grants to the Matthew 25 Coalition, RePlay for Kids and the Suicide Prevention Education Alliance.

The Millennium Fund for Children was established in 1999 by Akron Community Foundation and the Akron Beacon Journal. Every year, donors give at least one hour of their pay to the fund to help support children-related project, especially . nonprofit organizations that contribute to the arts, education and health of area children. Recently, it supported programs such as the Summit Special Olympic Athletic Club, Akron-Canton Regional Foodbank, Here's Hope Horse Farm, and Mobile Meals.

The Vernon L. Odom Fund supports Summit County's minority population. It gives grants to organizations to improve racial harmony and enrich the lives of local minorities. Recently, it has supported the Inner-City Soccer Team, the Youth Excellence Performance Arts Workshop, and the Butch Reynolds Care for Kids Foundation.

The Bath Community Fund was established in 2014 to preserve the area's environmental legacy.

External links 

 Official Website

References 

Organizations based in Akron, Ohio
Community foundations based in the United States
Non-profit organizations based in Ohio